is a tram station located in Toyohashi, Aichi, Japan in front of Toyohashi Station, the main train station of the city.

Lines 

Toyohashi Railroad
Azumada Main Line

Adjacent stations 

|-
!colspan=5|

References 

Railway stations in Aichi Prefecture
Railway stations in Japan opened in 1925